Current Topics in Medicinal Chemistry is a biweekly peer-reviewed medical journal published by Bentham Science Publishers. It includes review articles on all aspects of medicinal chemistry, including drug design. The current editor-in-chief is Jia Zhou (University of Texas, Medical Branch).

Abstracting and indexing 
The journal is abstracted and indexed in:

According to the Journal Citation Reports, the journal has a 2021 impact factor of 3.570.<ref https://benthamscience.com/press-releases/220070401/ </ref>

References

External links

Medicinal chemistry journals
Bentham Science Publishers academic journals
English-language journals
Publications established in 2001
Biweekly journals